Upper Sapey is a small village and civil parish in Herefordshire, England. The population of this civil parish as taken at the 2011 census was 460.

References

External links

Villages in Herefordshire